Mian Tariq Abdullah is a Pakistani politician who had been a member of the Provincial Assembly of the Punjab from August 2018 till January 2023.

Early life and education
He was born on 15 March 1957 in Multan, Pakistan.

He has a degree of Bachelor of Arts.

Political career

He was elected to the Provincial Assembly of the Punjab as a candidate of Pakistan Tehreek-e-Insaf from Constituency PP-220 (Multan-X) in 2018 Pakistani general election.

References

Living people
Pakistan Tehreek-e-Insaf MPAs (Punjab)
1957 births